Colin Scrivener (born January 4, 1970) played in the Canadian Football League for eight years. Scrivener played defensive tackle for two teams from 1995-2002.  His brother Glen also played in the CFL. He played his college football at the University of Oregon.

References

1970 births
Living people
Canadian football defensive linemen
Oregon Ducks football players
Players of Canadian football from Manitoba
Saskatchewan Roughriders players
Canadian football people from Winnipeg
Winnipeg Blue Bombers players